Island is a 1989 Australian film directed by Paul Cox starring Irene Papas as Marquise.

It is not to be confused with the 1975 short film of the same title also made by Cox.

Plot
A Czech-born woman arrives on a Greek island having fled Australia to sort out her problems. She becomes friends with a deaf mute and two other women, a Sri Lankan abandoned by her husband and an older Greek woman.

Production
The film was shot on a Greek island in 1988. It was plagued with money shortages during production, making the shoot extremely difficult.

Reception
Irene Papas was nominated in 1989 for Best Actress in her role for the Australian Film Institute.

References

External links

Island at Oz Movies

1989 films
Australian drama films
Films directed by Paul Cox
1980s Australian films